Eric Redman (born June 3, 1948, Palo Alto, California) is an American author and businessman.

Redman is a former legislative assistant to the late Senator Warren G. Magnuson and served him for two years circa 1971.  He wrote the book "The Dance of Legislation", a descriptive account of a single bill establishing the National Health Service Corps along its two-year trip through Congress.  The book was initially published in 1973, with a second edition in 2001. Redman has also written for a variety of other publications such as The New York Times , The Washington Post, Open Spaces, and many other publications, and was once a Contributing Editor of Rolling Stone.  His article on the climate effects of soot, "A Dirty Little Secret," appeared in the May–June 2005 issue of Legal Affairs.

Redman studied at Harvard College (1966–1970), was awarded a Rhodes Scholarship and studied at Oxford University (1970–1971), and obtained a J.D. degree from Harvard Law School in 1975.  He joined the law firm  Heller Ehrman LLP in 1983, and founded the firm's Energy Practice Group.

Redman left the practice of law after specializing in public policy and energy law for more than 30 years. From 2012 to October 2014 he was President of Summit Power Group Inc, a Seattle-based developer of wind, solar, gas-fired, and carbon-capture power plants.  Summit worked on developing the Texas Clean Energy Project in Odessa, Texas. Redman is currently Co-Chairman of Summit Power Group. He is now Senior Policy Fellow at University of California San Diego School of Global Policy and Strategy.

References 

Living people
1948 births
Harvard Law School alumni
American Rhodes Scholars
Washington (state) lawyers
Lawyers from Seattle
American male writers
Harvard College alumni